The Patriarchate of Antioch is the office and jurisdiction of the bishop or Patriarch of Antioch, the Christian Church's oldest episcopal see, tracing its origin to Saint Peter and originally located in Antioch, now Antakya in Turkey. It has been formally designated as Patriarchate since 531. Several traditions have claimed succession of the early Church of Antioch, none of which however has been based in Antioch/Antakya for centuries: 
 List of patriarchs of Antioch until 512
 Syriac Orthodox Church, est. 512 in Antioch and later relocated to Eastern Anatolia, then Homs, then Damascus
 List of Syriac Orthodox patriarchs of Antioch
 Syriac Catholic Church, est. 1662 in Damascus
List of Syriac Catholic patriarchs of Antioch
 Maronite Catholic Patriarchate of Antioch, est. 685 in the Qadisha Valley, later relocated while remaining in what is now Lebanon
 List of Maronite patriarchs of Antioch
 Greek Orthodox Church of Antioch, relocated to Damascus in the 14th century 
 List of Greek Orthodox patriarchs of Antioch
 Melkite Catholic Patriarchate of Antioch, est. 1724 in Damascus
 Latin Patriarchate of Antioch, est. 1098 as a Catholic see in Antioch, titular from 1268 until suppression in 1964
 Catholic Apostolic Church of Antioch, est. 1958 in Berlin, Germany
 Antioch International Movement of Churches, est. 1987 in Waco, Texas, United States
 Free Church of Antioch, est. 1992 in Santa Barbara, California, United States

See also
 Pentarchy
 Patriarchate of Constantinople (disambiguation)
 Patriarchate of Alexandria (disambiguation)
 Patriarchate of Jerusalem (disambiguation)
 History of Early Christianity
 Roman Catholic Archdiocese of Santa Fe de Antioquia
 Antiochian Greek Christians